Virginia Lee (born 6 April 1965) is an Australian former rower. She was a four-time national champion, a 1992 world champion and an Olympic bronze medal winner who competed in both sweep oared and sculling events in the lightweight division.

Club and state rowing
Lee was born in Sydney, Australia. Her senior rowing was from the Mosman Rowing Club in Sydney.

On eight occasions from 1986 to 1996 she represented New South Wales, racing for the Women's Lightweight Four Championship (the Victoria Cup) at the Australian Rowing Championships. Her crews won the championship in 1995 and 1996. They crossed the line first in 1988 but were disqualified for a doping infringement.

In 1995 and again in 2000 Lee won the Australian national lightweight single sculls title.

National representative rowing

World championships
She was selected to national representative honours for the 1986 and 1987 World Rowing Championships in the women's lightweight four who came fourth both times. At the 1992 World Rowing Championships in Montreal, Canada, she won a world championship in the lightweight four, with Marina Cade, Deirdre Fraser, and Liz Moller.

At the next world championships in Račice 1993, her Australian lightweight four finished in fourth place. The following year at Indianapolis 1994, she raced in a lightweight double scull which finished seventh. At the 1995 World Rowing Championships in Tampere, Finland, Lee was again part of the lightweight four, but the boat did not start. At those same championships she also competed in the lightweight women's double scull with Joanne Morgan and where they placed fourth. At the 1999 World Rowing Championships in St. Catharines, Ontario, Canada, she partnered with Sally Newmarch in the lightweight double scull to win a bronze medal.

Olympics
At the 1996 Summer Olympics in Atlanta, USA, she partnered with Rebecca Joyce and won bronze in the lightweight women's double sculls.  At the 2000 Summer Olympics in her home city of Sydney, she again competed with Newmarch in a lightweight double scull and they came fourth.

References

External links
 

1965 births
Living people
Australian female rowers
Sportswomen from New South Wales
Rowers at the 1996 Summer Olympics
Rowers at the 2000 Summer Olympics
Olympic bronze medalists for Australia
Olympic medalists in rowing
Rowers from Sydney
Medalists at the 1996 Summer Olympics
Commonwealth Games medallists in rowing
Commonwealth Games silver medallists for Australia
World Rowing Championships medalists for Australia
Rowers at the 1986 Commonwealth Games
20th-century Australian women
21st-century Australian women
Medallists at the 1986 Commonwealth Games